Crowe is a surname of Middle English origin. Its Old English origin means 'crow', and was a nickname for someone said to resemble this bird, probably if they had very dark hair. The name is historically most common in the English Counties of Norfolk and Suffolk particularly around the City of Norwich.  The name may alternatively have a Gaelic origin: in Ireland, it may originate as an anglicisation of Mac Enchroe while in the Isle of Man it represents an anglicised version of Mc Crawe (1540).

People with this name include:
 A. G. Crowe (born 1948), Louisiana politician
 Alan Crowe (born 1940), Isle of Man politician
 Alex Crowe (1924–1997), Scottish footballer with St Mirren and Ipswich Town
 Allen Crowe (1928–1963), American racecar driver
 Allison Crowe (born 1981), Canadian singer/songwriter
 Amanda Crowe (1928–2004), Cherokee woodcarver and educator
 Amee-Leigh Murphy Crowe (born 1995), Irish rugby sevens and union player
 Bob Crowe (footballer) (born 1936), Australian rules footballer
Brian Crowe (1938–2020) British diplomat, Ambassador to Austria 1989–1992 
 Cameron Crowe (born 1957), American screenwriter and film director
 Carl Crowe (born 1975), English cricketer
 Cathal Crowe (born 1982), Irish politician 
 Catherine Crowe (1790–1872), English novelist, story writer and playwright
 Cathy Crowe (born 1952), Canadian nurse, educator and social activist
 Charlie Crowe (1924–2010), English footballer with Newcastle United 
 Charles Crowe (1867–1953), Canadian sport shooter
 Christopher or Chris Crowe (disambiguation), several people
 Clem Crowe (1903–1983), American football and basketball player
 Sir Colin Crowe (1913–1989), British diplomat
 Craig Crowe (born 1979), English cricketer
 Curtis Crowe, American rock drummer
 Cyril Crowe (1894–1974), British World War I flying ace
 Dave Crowe (1933–2000), New Zealand cricketer
 David Crowe (disambiguation), several people
 Dean Crowe (born 1979), English footballer with Stoke City, Luton Town
 Ellen Crowe (c.1847–1930), Irish-New Zealand community leader
 Ellie Crowe, South African-American author
 Eugene B. Crowe (1878–1970), U.S. Representative from Indiana
 Sir Eyre Crowe (1864–1925), British diplomat
 Eyre Crowe (painter), (1824–1910), English painter
 Eyre Evans Crowe (1799–1868), English journalist and historian, nephew of the above
 Frances Crowe (1919–2019) American peace activist
 Frank Crowe (1882–1946), American civil engineer
 Frank W. Crowe (1919–1987), American physician
 Frederick Crowe (1862–1931), English organist
 George Crowe (disambiguation), several people
 Glen Crowe (born 1977), Irish footballer with Bohemians, Ireland
 Heather Crowe (activist) (1945–2006), Canadian anti-smoking campaigner
Heather Crowe (tennis), American tennis player
 Henry Crowe (disambiguation), several people
 Imogen Claire (1943–2005), born Crowe, English dancer and actress 
 J. D. Crowe (1937–2021), American banjo player and bluegrass band leader
 Jack Crowe (born 1947), American football coach
 Jason Crowe (born 1978), English footballer with Portsmouth, Northampton
 Jason Crowe (basketball) (born 1976), American professional basketball player
 Jeff Crowe (born 1958), former New Zealand cricketer
 Jim Crowe (footballer) (1909–1979), Australian rules footballer
 John Crowe (disambiguation), several people
 Joseph Crowe (disambiguation), several people
 Leo Crowe (1912–1966), American basketball player
 Mark Crowe (footballer) (born 1965), English footballer with Torquay United, Cambridge United
 Martin Crowe (1962–2016), former New Zealand cricketer
 Matt Crowe (1932–2017), Scottish  footballer with Partick Thistle, Norwich City 
 Michael Crowe (disambiguation), several people
 Morrill Martin Crowe (1901–1994), Richmond, Virginia, pharmacist and politician
 Neville Crowe (1937–2016), former Australian rules footballer
 Nick Crowe (disambiguation), several people
 Ollie Crowe, Irish politician
 Owen Crowe (born 1982), Canadian professional poker player 
 Pamela Crowe, Isle of Man politician
 Pat Crowe (1864–1938), aka Frank Roberts, American criminal turned author and lecturer
 Patrick Crowe (1892–1969), Irish Fine Gael politician
 Peggy Crowe (1956–2012), American speed skater
 Phil Crowe (born 1970), Canadian ice hockey winger
 Ray Crowe (1915–2003), American politician and basketball coach
 Raymond Crowe, Australian mime artist, magician and cabaret performer
 Robert Crowe (cyclist) (born 1968), Australian cyclist
 Robert Crowe (singer), American sopranist and musicologist
 Robert E. Crowe (1879–1958), Chicago lawyer and politician
 Russell Crowe (born 1964), New Zealander Australian actor
 Rusty Crowe (born 1947), Tennessee politician
 Sir Sackville Crowe, 1st Baronet (c.1611–c.1683), English nobleman and politician
 Sanford Johnston Crowe (1868–1931), Canadian politician
 Sara Crowe (born 1966), Scottish actress
 Seán Crowe (born 1957), Irish Sinn Féin politician
 Simon Crowe (born 1955), drummer for Irish band The Boomtown Rats
 Steve Crowe (disambiguation), several people
 Susan Crowe, Canadian folk singer-songwriter
 Dame Sylvia Crowe (1901–1997), English landscape architect
 Tom Crowe (1922–2010), BBC radio announcer
Tom Crowe (footballer) (1880–1914), Australian rules footballer
 Tonya Crowe (born 1971), American actress
 Trevor Crowe (born 1983), American Major League baseball player
 Trisha Crowe, Australian soprano
 Vic Crowe (1932–2009), Welsh footballer with Aston Villa, Wales
 William Crowe (disambiguation), several people

See also 

 Crow (surname)

References

English-language surnames